The 2007–08 Georgian Ice Hockey League season was the first season of the Georgian Ice Hockey League, the top level of ice hockey in Georgia. Four teams participated in the league, and the Grey Wolves Tbilisi won the championship.

Regular season

External links
Season on eurohockey.com

Georgia
Georgian Ice Hockey League seasons